Sakchai Sim Ngam (born 12 July 1952) is a Thai former professional snooker player. He won the IBSF World Snooker Championship in 1995.

Career 
A former kickboxer, Sim Ngam won the 1984 ACBS Asian Snooker Championship with an 8–5 defeat of Vichien Sangthong in the final. The following year, he reached the final again but lost 5–8 to Gary Kwok.

Sim Ngam was accepted as a professional by the World Professional Billiards and Snooker Association (WPBSA) in 1985, becoming the first Thai professional player. His first professional match resulted in a 5–2 win against David Greaves in the first qualifying round 1985 Matchroom Trophy, before he was defeated 4–5 by Les Dodd in the following round. In his next tournament, the 1985 Grand Prix, he recorded 5–3 wins over both Derek Mienie and Fred Davis to reach the third qualifying round, where he was eliminated 1–5 by Eugene Hughes. He also reached the third qualifying round of the 1985 UK Championship, losing 4–9 to Joe Johnson after defeating Roger Bales and Mick Fisher. He never progressed further in a professional tournament than he did in these events.

He was part of the Rest of the World Team for the 1986 World Cup that was eliminated after losing 0–5 to Canada in their first match. Sim Ngam played one , which he lost 6–102 to Bill Werbeniuk.

Sim Ngam resigned his membership of WPBSA in 1987, when ranked 80th, and did not play in any professional events again until he was a wild card entrant to the 1995 Thailand Open, 1996 Thailand Open, and 1996 Asian Classic. His highest snooker world ranking was 80.

He won the amateur 1995 IBSF World Snooker Championship, defeating David Lilley 11–7 after trailing 5–7 at the end of the first day of the final. As defending champion at the 1996 IBSF World Snooker Championship, he was 2–4 behind Stan Gorski in the last 16 round, but then equalised at 4–4 after needing Gorski to concede points from two  in the eighth frame. Gorski made a break of 51 in the deciding frame and won the match 5–4.

Career finals

Non-ranking finals: 3 (1 title)

Pro-am finals: 1 (1 title)

Amateur finals: 4 (3 titles)

References

Sakchai Sim Ngam
1952 births
Living people
Sakchai Sim Ngam